Winston Churchill High School (most commonly known as Churchill; also Winston or WCHS) is one of three public secondary schools in Lethbridge, Alberta, Canada, serving grades nine, ten, eleven, and twelve. Entry is loosely based on location in north Lethbridge. The school is in the Winston Churchill neighborhood.

Beginning in the 2003-2004 school year, Grade 9 students began attending the school, in accordance with a nearly province-wide grade reconfiguration that saw "middle" school become grades 6-8, and "high school" redefined as grades 9-12. The school offers several specialty programs, including the internationally recognized International Baccalaureate program.

International Baccalaureate 
The International Baccalaureate program is locally similar to the Advanced Placement Program, which is offered at L.C.I.  Courses offered include
Social Studies, Mathematics, French, Spanish, Biology, 
Chemistry, and Music.

Overview

Athletics 
The following sports are inter-scholastic at W.C.H.S.:
Cross country running
Curling
Athletics
Football
Baseball
Basketball
Golf
Rugby union

Curricular Programs 
National Honor Society
Fine Arts Program (Art, band, drama, choir)
English as an additional language
Second Languages (French and French IB, Japanese, German, Spanish and Spanish IB) 
Career & Technology Studies (CTS):
Keyboarding
Financial Studies
Legal Studies
Food Studies
Fashion Studies
Drafting (CAD)
Woodworking (Construction Technologies)
Robotics Team

Alumni and Notable Students 
Jason Zuback, 6 time world long drive champion
Loudia Laarman, sprinter
James Steacy, two-time Olympian in hammer throw
Dylan Steenbergen, football player
Kris Versteeg, Retired NHL player
Matthew Hrudey, volunteer volleyball videographer

References 

2004 Winston Churchill High School Brochure

External links 
W.C.H.S. Home Page

High schools in Alberta
International Baccalaureate schools in Alberta
Schools in Lethbridge
Educational institutions established in 1961
1961 establishments in Alberta